Bisaran Rural District is a rural district (dehestan) in the Central District of Sarvabad County, Kurdistan Province, Iran. At the 2006 census, its population was 5,251, in 1,276 families. The rural district has 5 villages.

References 

Rural Districts of Kurdistan Province
Sarvabad County